Wapping Dock is a dock on the River Mersey, England, and part of the Port of Liverpool. It is situated in the southern dock system, connected to Salthouse Dock to the north, Queen's Dock to the south. King's Dock was originally located to the west, but has since been filled in.

History
The dock was opened in 1852. It was named after the road it runs alongside and which also gave its name to the Wapping Tunnel.

The large brick warehouse built in 1856 along the eastern side of the dock was designed by Jesse Hartley. The building is of a similar architectural style to the warehouses surrounding the nearby Albert Dock. Bombed in the May Blitz of 1941, the badly damaged southernmost section was not rebuilt, with only the supporting cast iron columns remaining in situ. The remainder of the building continued in commercial use, even after the dock closed in 1972. The warehouse was restored and converted into residential apartments in 1988 and is Grade II* listed.

References

Sources

Further reading

External links

 
   Wapping Dock aerial photo

Liverpool docks
Grade II listed buildings in Liverpool